Luigina Giavotti (October 12, 1916 – August 4, 1976) was an Italian gymnast who competed in the 1928 Summer Olympics. In 1928 she won the silver medal as a member of the Italian gymnastics team.

She was the youngest medalist of the Amsterdam Games and also the youngest female Olympic medalist of all time at the age of 11 years and 302 days. Her record cannot be beaten because the current rules for gymnasts in the Olympics say that they must be at least 16 years old in order to compete.

References

1916 births
1976 deaths
Italian female artistic gymnasts
Olympic gymnasts of Italy
Gymnasts at the 1928 Summer Olympics
Olympic silver medalists for Italy
Olympic medalists in gymnastics
Medalists at the 1928 Summer Olympics
20th-century Italian women